Tristaniopsis macphersonii is a species of plant in the family Myrtaceae. It is endemic to New Caledonia.

References

Endemic flora of New Caledonia
macphersonii
Vulnerable plants
Taxonomy articles created by Polbot
Taxa named by John Dawson (botanist)